Tim Shaw (born 9 June 1974) is a British radio host, TV presenter and engineer. He is currently  hosting a selection of factual engineering and science TV series on the National Geographic TV channel in both the US and International territories. He previously hosted TV series in the UK for Channel 4, Channel 5, More4, Virgin1, Discovery and Current TV.

Early life
Before pursuing a career in radio and television, he studied Mechanical Engineering and Product Design at university. He has a degree in Professional Broadcasting.

Career

Radio
Shaw began working for Kerrang! Radio in 2004, on The Asylum. It broadcast between 10:00 pm and 1:00 am Sunday to Thursday with help from members of his team nicknamed Juicy Lucy (Lucy Helliwell), Donkhole, Knob Holder (Greg Pebble), Duncan Donuts (Duncan North), Slippy Knickers, Chris Peacock and Toenail and his special friend Judith the Clairvoyant to name a few. The show ended on 20 September 2007.

In 2005, Shaw and his then colleague Greg Prebble performed a mock burglary at the Sutton Coldfield home of Kerrang Radio's then station director, Andrew Jeffries, live on air. The living room was sprayed with obscene graffiti and a window smashed. The stunt resulted in Shaw being suspended by the station.

On 11 September 2007, Kerrang! Radio announced that Shaw had been given the breakfast slot. The show began on 1 October 2007, hosted by Shaw and Kate Lawler and airing between 7:00 and 10:00 am Monday to Friday.

Shaw was dismissed from Kerrang Radio on 23 April 2008 as the result of an Ofcom investigation into the running of an on-air competition. OFCOM found that in a competition to give two tickets to a Rolling Stones documentary, Shaw had planned to award the tickets to a friend, pre-record his "entry" and play it "as live" instead of running a genuine competition.

Shaw presented Absolution on Absolute Radio, previously Virgin Radio, each Friday and Saturday night, 10:00 pm to 1:00 am. The show took almost the same format as his former Kerrang! Radio show, The Asylum. The first show aired on 3 October 2008. With the original team of Roque Segade-Vieito and Eloise Carr, Shaw won the Sony Award for Best Entertainment Show in 2009.

Shaw presented Tim Shaw's Rehab on BRMB and Networked on Orion Media stations Wyvern, Beacon and Mercia each Friday and Saturday night, 10:00 pm to 1:00 am, with help from members of his team Jamie Lee, Pants, Slippy Knickers and Donkhole plus various guests. The show took almost the same format as his former Absolute Radio and Kerrang! Radio shows The Absolution and The Asylum. The first show aired on 15 January 2010.

Shaw hosted a Sunday afternoon show on Bauer Radio-owned Rock FM in Preston. The show was later networked by Rock FM's eight sister stations, including CFM, Hallam FM, Key 103, Radio Aire, Radio City, Metro Radio, TFM and Viking FM.

Television

Street Genius (formerly known as None of the Above) is a National Geographic popular science TV show, aired in 140 countries, in which Shaw conducts experiments on the streets and offers viewers a multiple choice question, including "none of the above", and once members of the public answer correctly what the outcome will be, the science behind the experiment is explained. It is filmed on the west coast of the United States.

Currently in its tenth series on the National Geographic Channel, Car SOS features Shaw and mechanic Fuzz Townshend restoring classic cars from across Europe, which are often in serious states of disrepair. The owners, and their cars, unbeknownst to them, are nominated by a relative or friend because of an inability to restore the vehicle themselves, often for medical and/or financial reasons. The owners are then surprised with the car at a staged event, usually setup by Shaw. 

True Tube is a concept devised by Shaw and production company Nerd TV, which was originally commissioned as a TV show to be aired by Sky1 in 2013. The concept was to recreate the craziest stunts on YouTube and break down the engineering involved. Following the success of Shaw's other shows on their channel, National Geographic stepped in and bought the show from Sky in early 2014. The show aired on 5 February 2014. Shaw's co-host is his friend Buddy Munro.
 
In August 2008, Shaw became a presenter on Fifth Gear for series 14.

On 7 May 2009, Shaw hosted Extreme Male Beauty for Channel 4, a show that explored male vanity and the various beauty standards that are placed on men but often overlooked. Throughout the course of the show, he explored people's reactions to his own body and made choices on how to improve himself that include a change in diet, plastic surgery and exercise.

Shaw was one of the presenters on Britain's Top 5... which aired in December 2012 on Quest, an engineering show about mankind's greatest mechanical achievements.

Shaw featured on Channel 4's Balls of Steel, in which he was called "Mr. Inappropriate" and did outrageous things in public.

Shaw presented a six-part series called Experimental, which aired on Channel 4 in 2015.

Holocaust interview

At the end of 2006, Shaw interviewed Kitty Hart-Moxon, a survivor of the Holocaust and the death camp Auschwitz-Birkenau. Shaw believed that the interview would last 90 minutes but it actually lasted just under seven hours. Shaw went ahead with the interview as he believed that schools attempting to teach the Holocaust in a 50-minute history lesson was "a disgrace". Of the interview, Shaw himself said "This has changed my life and the best thing I have done in a long time" and audience feedback was generally positive.

Controversy
Shaw's wife, Hayley, sold his Lotus Esprit, worth £25,000, for 50p on eBay after he joked with Jodie Marsh live on air that he would leave his wife and two children for her. Hayley placed the lot on the auction site at the "buy it now" price of 50p with the description "I need to get rid of this car in the next two to three hours before my husband gets home to find it gone and all his belongings in the street." The car sold within five minutes.

Awards

References

External links
 Personal website

British radio DJs
English radio personalities
Living people
Place of birth missing (living people)
1974 births
Shock jocks